The Amstrad CPC character set (alternatively known as the BASIC graphics character set) is the character set used in the Amstrad CPC series of 8-bit personal computers when running BASIC (the default mode, until it boots into CP/M). This character set existed in the built-in "lower" ROM chip. It is based on ASCII-1967, with the exception of character 0x5E which is the up arrow instead of the circumflex, as it is in ASCII-1963, a feature shared with other character sets of the time. Apart from the standard printable ASCII range (0x20-0x7e), it is completely different from the Amstrad CP/M Plus character set. The BASIC character set had symbols of particular use in games and home computing, while the CP/M Plus character reflected the International and Business flavor of the CP/M Plus environment. This character set is represented in Unicode (excluding 0xEF, 0xFC, and 0xFD) as of the March 2020 release of Unicode 13.0, which added symbols for legacy computing.

Character set

Control characters 

Each of the characters in the C0 character range (0x00-0x1F) had a special function.

References 

Character sets